Abbasabad (also Romanized as ‘Abbāsābād) is a village in Meshkan Rural District, Meshkan District, Khoshab County, Razavi Khorasan Province, Iran. At the 2006 census, its population was 157, in 59 families.

See also 

 List of cities, towns and villages in Razavi Khorasan Province

References 

Populated places in Khoshab County